Radio 2 is a public radio station in Accra, the capital town of the Greater Accra Region of Ghana. The station is owned and run by the state broadcaster - the Ghana Broadcasting Corporation (GBC). The station is one of two national stations run by GBC. The station is the commercial service of the broadcasting house. It broadcasts all its programmes in English.

References

Radio stations in Ghana
Greater Accra Region
Mass media in Accra